The 86th Pennsylvania House of Representatives District is located in central Pennsylvania and has been represented by Perry A. Stambaugh since 2021.

District profile
The 86th District encompasses part of Juniata County and all of Perry County and includes the following areas: 

Juniata County

Beale Township
Delaware Township
Fermanagh Township
Greenwood Township
Lack Township
Mifflin
Mifflintown
Milford Township
Port Royal
Spruce Hill Township
Susquehanna Township
Thompsontown
Turbett Township
Tuscarora Township
Walker Township

Perry County

Representatives

References

Government of Cumberland County, Pennsylvania
Government of Perry County, Pennsylvania
86